Czech Republic–Russia relations are the bilateral foreign relations between the Czech Republic and the Russian Federation. Relations have substantially deteriorated in recent years due to events such as the Russian annexation of Crimea in 2014, Russian sabotage of Czech ammunition depot in Vrbětice in 2014, poisoning of Sergei Skripal in 2018 and Russian invasion of Ukraine in 2022.

Both countries are full members of the Council of Europe (though Russia's membership has been suspended) and the Organization for Security and Co-operation in Europe. The Czech Republic has an embassy in Moscow. The Russian Federation has an embassy in Prague.

History

Background 

During the entire medieval period and early modern period, the Czech lands, in the form of Duchy of Bohemia and Kingdom of Bohemia, were aligned with the Catholic Holy Roman Empire and later Austrian Empire. 

Czechoslovakia recognized the Soviet Union de jure and the countries established diplomatic relations in June 1934. On 16 May 1935, the Czechoslovak–Soviet Treaty of Mutual Assistance was signed between the two governments that followed the similar treaty between the USSR and France, which was Czechoslovakia's major ally.

Following the German occupation of Czechoslovakia and the establishment of the pro-German Slovak state in March 1939, the Soviet Union promptly recognized the new status quo and terminated diplomatic relations with Czech representatives. Shortly after the Munich Agreement, many Czechoslovak Communists gained asylum in the Soviet Union, however hundreds of non-communist refugees were sent to labour camps.

Following World War II and the USSR-backed pro-Soviet coup d'état in February 1948, Czechoslovakia became part of the Soviet-led Eastern Bloc and was one of the founding members of the Warsaw Pact in May 1955. In August 1968, in response to the Prague Spring pro-democracy reforms of the Czech government, the Soviet-led invasion re-established the hardline Communist rule by force. 108 Czechs and Slovaks died and approximately 500 were wounded as a direct result of the invasion. This damaged relations between the two countries.

1989–2020 
Following the Velvet Revolution of 1989 and the dissolution of Czechoslovakia in January 1993, Russia immediately recognized the independent Czech Republic and the two states established diplomatic relations on 1 January 1993. During an official visit by Russia′s president Boris Yeltsin to the Czech Republic in August 1993, the Treaty of Friendship and Cooperation was signed by Yeltsin and Czech president Václav Havel.

The independent Czech Republic re-aligned its foreign policy and economic interests with Western allies throughout the 1990's, and joined NATO in march 1999 and the European Union in May 2004.

In December 2011, Russian president Dmitry Medvedev visited Prague, to sign economic contracts and cultural exchange. Both countries consider each other as an important economic partner.

As a response to the Russian military intervention in Ukraine from 2014, the Czech Republic has participated in enacting economic sanctions against Russia. In March 2018, the Czech Republic expelled three Russian diplomats as a reaction to the poisoning of Sergei and Yulia Skripal in the United Kingdom. 

In March 2018, the Czech Republic arrested and extradited a Russian hacker into the United States on American request. 

In late 2010s, the controversy about the statue of Ivan Konev in Prague has been one of the issues that caught public attention in this area. 

Miloš Zeman, president of the Czech Republic from March 2013, has been described as "one of the European Union's most Kremlin-friendly leaders", with some of his close aides said to be agents of Russian intelligence. Zeman has supported Russia on issues such as the Russo-Ukrainian War, thereby defying NATO′s and EU′s official policies.

2021–present 
On 17 April 2021, the Czech prime minister Andrej Babiš announced that the Czech Republic was expelling 18 Russian diplomats it had identified as GRU and SVR spies — after the Czech intelligence agencies had concluded that Russian military intelligence officers, namely members of Russian military intelligence GRU's unit 29155, were involved in two massive ammunition depot explosions in Vrbětice (part of Vlachovice), near the Czech-Slovak border, in October 2014. Shortly after, the Czech Republic formally informed the NATO allies on the matter and requested a joint statement at the NATO level as well as a follow-up North Atlantic Council meeting "to discuss other possible coordinated steps". In the wake of the expulsion, Bloomberg News commented that "in a rare act of unity, Zeman took the government’s side against Putin". The Russian government responded by expelling 20 Czech diplomats.

Following Russia's own diplomatic response of expelling Czech diplomats, the newly appointed Czech foreign minister Jakub Kulhánek on 21 April gave the Russian government an ultimatum saying Russia had until 12 p.m. the next day to allow the return of all the Czech diplomats it had expelled from Moscow back to the Czech Embassy in Moscow and if that did not happen "he would cut the number of Russian Embassy staff in Prague so it would correspond to the current situation at the Czech Embassy in Moscow". On 22 April, as Russia refused to abide with the Czech demands in returning Czech staff to the Embassy in Moscow, the Czech foreign ministry announced it was reducing and capping the number of staff at the Russian Embassy in Prague at the current number of their staff in Moscow; the Russian embassy staff were required to leave the Czech Republic by 31 May 2021. The Czech government response was followed with support by a number of other EU countries expelling Russia′s diplomatic personnel. The Russian government responded by setting the Czech Republic on its 'unfriendly countries list' along with the United States. As a result the Czech embassy in Moscow are allowed to only hire up to 19 Russian locals, while the U.S. embassy in Moscow are not allowed to hire any Russian locals.

Trade

The value of trade between the Czech Republic and Russia is in billions of US dollars. Most imports from Russia into the Czech Republic are raw materials such as fuels and metals; exports from the Czech Republic to Russia are mostly manufactured products.

However, Russia was a smaller trade partner for the Czech Republic in 2016 following its economic downturn in 2015, as it was the destination of only 1.7% for Czech exports in 2016. The vast majority of exports from the Czech Republic go to other EU members (84.1% in 2016) while most imports into the Czech Republic come from other EU members (76,6% in 2013) or from China (7,3% in 2016). Despite that Czech-Russian trade was still higher than with US trade, reaching 9.21 billion US dollar for the Czech Republic in 2019. Czech exports to Russia grew 38.8% in 2016 to 2019.

Public opinion 

While economic relations were good prior to the 2014 sanctions, and the Czech Republic is a common tourist destination for Russians, the Czech people themselves tend to be distrustful of Russia due to the Soviet invasion of 1968, and tend to hold a negative opinion of Russians as a legacy of Soviet-era conflicts. Among Czechs, Russia continuously remains one of the most negatively perceived countries in public opinion polls, and in 2016 only 26% of Czechs responded that they have either a "very favorable" or "favorable" opinion about Russia (versus 37% responding "unfavorable" or "very unfavorable"). For comparison, in the same poll, Czechs had similarly limited "very favorable" or "favorable" responses for other Eastern European countries (Ukraine 22%; Serbia 27%) and more "very favorable" or "favorable" responses for Western European countries (France 69%; U.K. 67%).

Russia's espionage and other illicit activity in Czech Republic 

The 2006 annual report by the Czech intelligence agency, Security Information Service (BIS), spoke of high levels of Russian espionage in the Czech Republic and highlighted "security risks including an increasing influence by organized crime in the state sector". The report also stated that "intelligence services of the Russian Federation operating on Czech territory organize media campaigns and other activities supporting Russian interests" and that the Czech Republic has been targeted by Russia due to its membership in NATO and the EU reflecting Russia's interests to acquire information about the functioning of these institutions. Russian influence has especially targeted Russian economic interests in the Czech Republic (i.e. the energy sector), but has also infiltrated into politics and media. The Russian intelligence activity focused on pro-Russian propaganda and on political, scientific, technical and economic espionage.

In 2009, two Russian diplomats were expelled from the Czech Republic due to espionage. As of 2015, according to the Security Information Service, the most active foreign espionage in the Czech Republic originated from Russia, followed by China. 

As of 2017, there were 140 Russian nationals accredited in the Czech Republic as diplomats, a disproportionately large number compared to other countries, and also compared to only 65 Czech diplomats in Russia. Senior representatives of the 40,000-strong ethnic Russian community in the Czech Republic has accused the Russian Embassy of attempting to recruit the community′s members as agents of influence, setting up the Coordinating Council of the Russian Compatriots in the Czech Republic.

In December 2018, the BIS revealed that it prevented the activity of dozens of Russian spies during the previous five years, and earlier that year it uncovered and broke up a network of Russian intelligence informants.

According to a 2016 study by the Czech Masaryk University in Brno, pro-Russian websites Sputnik and Parlamentní listy are major pro-Russian in the Czech Republic; the latter of which is described by the report as a particular source of disinformation along with several other publications. Russian information war focuses on spreading misinformation about the EU and NATO, trying to change public perception of Russia and bribing local politicians. Czech officials estimate that the Russian government is behind approximately 40 Czech-language websites presenting radical views, conspiracy theories and inaccurate reports. According to Tomáš Prouza, the "key goal of Russian propaganda in the Czech Republic is to sow doubts into the minds of the people that democracy is the best system to organize a country, to build negative images of the European Union and NATO, and [to] discourage people from participation in the democratic processes".

In 2017, a special unit, the Centre Against Terrorism and Hybrid Threats, was founded under the Ministry of the Interior to counter the threats from Russia among other issues. Czech investigative journalists publish an up-to date list of pro-Russian publications.

Russians in the Czech Republic

Immigration 
There is an immigrant minority of 33 970 Russian citizens with a residence permit in the Czech Republic for a period of 12 months or more, as of 2016. It is the fourth largest immigrant group after Slovaks, Ukrainians and Vietnamese, followed by Germans. Russians have the largest proportion of university educated individuals among other immigrant groups. Most incoming Russians are members of the middle or upper classes and their reasons for migration into the Czech Republic are desire for a life in the European Union, better healthcare in the Czech Republic, high levels of corruption in Russia and also political reasons. Russian immigrants have large proportion of business people in comparison with other immigrant groups.

Tourism 
The Czech Republic is a popular destination for Russian tourists. In 2017, over 550,000 Russians visited the country.

See also
 Foreign relations of the Czech Republic
 Foreign relations of Russia

References

External links
Embassy of the Czech Republic in Moscow
Consulate-General of the Czech Republic in Saint Petersburg 
 Embassy of the Russian Federation in Prague

 
Russia
Bilateral relations of Russia